Veľké Kostoľany is a village and municipality in Piešťany District in the Trnava Region of western Slovakia.

History
In historical records the village was first mentioned in 1209.

Geography
The municipality lies at an altitude of 167 metres and covers an area of 24.386 km2. It has a population of about 2658 people.

Points of interest
 Veľké Kostoľany transmitter

References

External links

  Official page
https://web.archive.org/web/20070513023228/http://www.statistics.sk/mosmis/eng/run.html

Villages and municipalities in Piešťany District